Bad Rodach is a town in the district of Coburg, in Upper Franconia, a north Bavarian Regierungsbezirk, Germany. It is situated 10 km southeast of Hildburghausen, and 17 km northwest of Coburg. Since 1999 the city has been a spa-resort and is reported to have the warmest thermal spring in the North of Bavaria.

Description
Bad Rodach is in Upper Franconia, in the District of Coburg approximately 17 km northwest of Coburg.  It is situated between the Lange Berge hills and Gleichberge mountains. The river Rodach crosses through the town.

The town is composed of the following boroughs:

History
Within the Holy Roman Empire (962-1806), Rodach was part of the Duchy of Saxe-Coburg-Saalfeld (1699–1825). Within the German Empire (1871-1918), Rodach was part of the Duchy of Saxe-Coburg and Gotha.

Personalities who were active in Rodach
 Francis Josias, Duke of Saxe-Coburg-Saalfeld (1697-1764), sovereign of the duchy, died in Rodach.
 1814 the poet Friedrich Rückert (1788-1866), spent a few days in Rodach and wrote his poem  Idyllic Rodach .
 Helmut Markwort, (born 1936), journalist, publisher, and former editor in chief  of the news magazine Focus, spent part of his youth and attended elementary school in Bad Rodach.

References

Coburg (district)
Saxe-Coburg and Gotha
Spa towns in Germany